Kieran Joyce (born 24 July 1996) is an English-born Irish rugby union player who is currently a member of the Seattle Seawolves of Major League Rugby (MLR). He plays as a centre. 

Joyce previously represented Connacht and Corinthians in the All-Ireland League.

Professional rugby career

Connacht
Whilst still in the academy, Joyce made his senior competitive debut for Connacht in their 22–10 home victory against French side Perpignan during the 2018–19 Challenge Cup on 8 December 2018.

Seattle Seawolves
Joyce signed with the Seattle Seawolves for the 2021 Major League Rugby season.

References

External links
Connacht Academy Profile
Guinness Pro14 Profile

1996 births
Living people
Irish rugby union players
Galwegians RFC players
Connacht Rugby players
Rugby union centres
Seattle Seawolves players
Rugby union players from Warwickshire